The 1982 Chattanooga Moccasins football team represented the University of Tennessee at Chattanooga as a member of the Southern Conference (SoCon) in the 1982 NCAA Division I-AA football season. The Moccasins were led by third-year head coach Bill Oliver and played their home games at Chamberlain Field. They finished the season 7–4 overall and 5–1 in SoCon play to place in second.

Schedule

References

Chattanooga
Chattanooga Mocs football seasons
Chattanooga Moccasins football